Svajūnas is a Lithuanian masculine given name. People bearing the name Svajūnas include:
 Svajūnas Adomaitis (born 1985), Lithuanian Greco-Roman wrestler
 Svajūnas Ambrazas (born 1967), Lithuanian orienteering competitor
 Svajūnas Jonauskas (born 1995), Lithuanian racing cyclist

Lithuanian masculine given names